Elizabeth Arnold may refer to:

Elizabeth Arnold (poet) (born 1958), American poet
Elizabeth Arnold (singer), British classical singer
Elizabeth Arnold (swimmer) (born 1973), British swimmer
Elizabeth Arnold (children's writer) (born 1944), English children's writer
Elizabeth Arnold (reporter), American news reporter
Eliza Poe (née Elizabeth Arnold, 1787–1811), English actress and mother of Edgar Allan Poe